USS Argonaut (SS-475) was a  operated by the United States Navy (USN). Constructed at Portsmouth Navy Yard during the second half of 1944, Argonaut was commissioned into the USN in 1945 and operated during the final year of World War II, although her only contact with the Japanese was when she sank a junk in August. During the 1950s, the submarine was modified for greater underwater endurance, and to guide the Regulus I missile. From 1963 to 1965, Argonaut operated in the Mediterranean Sea.

The submarine was sold to Canada in 1968, commissioned into Maritime Command as HMCS Rainbow (SS 75), and operated until the end of 1974. The submarine was returned to the United States, and scrapped in 1977.

US service
Argonaut was laid down at Portsmouth Navy Yard at Kittery, Maine on 28 June 1944. She was launched on 1 October 1944 sponsored by Mrs. Allan R. McCann and commissioned on 15 January 1945, Lieutenant Commander John S. Schmidt in command.

Argonaut held shakedown in the Portsmouth area and in Narragansett Bay and returned briefly to Portsmouth on 27 March for post-shakedown availability. She then sailed on 14 April for Key West, Florida, where she conducted special tests for lighter-than-air craft and training operations with the Fleet Sound School. Argonaut departed the Florida coast on 13 May to transit the Panama Canal en route Hawaii. Reaching Pearl Harbor on 11 June, the submarine spent two weeks in repairs and training exercises before beginning her first war patrol on 28 June.

She made a fuel stop at Saipan on 10 July and then proceeded to the Formosa Strait and the East China and Yellow Seas to search for enemy shipping. Her only contact with Japanese vessels during the patrol came on 12 August, when Argonaut sank a 25-ton junk with fire from her 40 mm and 20 mm guns. Since she terminated her patrol at Guam on 21 August, six days after Japan capitulated, this was her only combat action during World War II.

Post-war
Argonaut departed Guam on 1 September and proceeded, via Pearl Harbor and the Panama Canal, to the Naval Frontier Base at Tompkinsville, New York. She arrived in New York on 4 October but continued on to the Portsmouth Naval Shipyard for an overhaul. Early in 1946, Argonaut was assigned to the Atlantic Fleet and was based at Panama. The submarine was in for major repairs for many months at New London, Connecticut. Later in 1946, Argonaut became a unit of Submarine Squadron 2 (SubRon 2) based at New London, Connecticut.

In July 1952, Argonaut underwent a major conversion as part of the Fleet Snorkel program at the Philadelphia Naval Shipyard, during which she received a snorkel system and a streamlined sail. These changes gave the submarine greater submerged speed and range. Argonaut was one of the few Fleet Snorkel submarines to retain her 5-inch deck gun. The gun was removed by 1957.

Argonaut operated from New London until July 1955, when she was reassigned to SubRon 6 at Norfolk, Virginia. Following this move, Argonaut was converted to a guided missile submarine armed with a Regulus I missile.

In 1958, Argonauts home port was changed to San Juan, Puerto Rico, where she remained for a year, engaged primarily in missile operations as guidance submarine for Regulus missiles. The submarine returned to Norfolk, Virginia in 1959. During an overhaul in early 1960, Argonauts missile equipment was removed. When the alterations were completed, the submarine resumed her routine of supporting antisubmarine warfare (ASW) training operations out of Norfolk. Her commanding officer from 1960 to 1962 was Lieutenant-Commander (LCDR) Earl Resch.

In June 1962, LCDR Theodore A. Curtin became Argonauts commanding officer. On 15 October 1962, Argonaut performed duties in conjunction with the naval quarantine of Cuba. She then had a routine overhaul at the Norfolk Naval Shipyard. The yard work was completed on 13 May 1963, and the submarine sailed to the New London area for refresher training. After further training in the Virginia Capes area, she got underway on 19 August for the Mediterranean and service with the 6th Fleet. Her ports of call during the deployment included Gibraltar; Suda Bay, Crete; Rhodes, Greece; İzmir, Turkey; Toulon, France; Marseille, France; Sanremo, Italy and Naples, Italy. The submarine returned to home port on 15 December.

Argonaut continued her routine of operations along the U.S. east coast with periodic deployments to the Mediterranean.  LCDR Floyd Holloway became her commanding officer in June 1964 (through 1966). On 1 December 1965 Argonaut commenced overhaul at the Norfolk Naval Shipyard. Argonaut left the shipyard on 10 June 1966 for sea trials, and on 20 January headed for New London for refresher training. She then provided services to the submarine school at New London through the remainder of 1966.

The submarine moved to Norfolk early in 1967, but left the Virginia Capes area on 9 January, bound for San Juan, Puerto Rico. Argonaut took part in Operation "Springboard" through the rest of January and most of February before leaving the Caribbean on 23 February to return to Norfolk, arriving there five days later. For the next two months, Argonaut prepared for a North Atlantic and Mediterranean cruise. She sailed on 26 May and made her first port call at Trondheim, Norway. The submarine also visited Cuxhaven, Germany; Leith, Scotland; Rota, Spain; Naples, Italy; and Valletta, Malta, before returning to her home port on 20 September. She remained in the local operating area through the duration of the year.

The submarine traveled to New London on 6 February 1968, entered drydock there on 9 February, and remained in it through 26 February. Argonaut left the keelblocks on 27 February and returned to Norfolk. She made a patrol in the Jacksonville, Florida operating area in mid-March and put in at Port Everglades, Florida on 22 March. Three days later the submarine got underway for her home port. Upon her arrival in Norfolk on 29 March, she assumed a schedule of local operations. This was interrupted by another cruise to Port Everglades in October. She returned that month to Norfolk and began preparations for deactivation. Argonaut was decommissioned on 2 December, and her name was struck from the Naval Vessel Register that same day.

Canadian service
In 1968 Argonaut was put up for sale by the United States. Offered to the Royal Canadian Navy, the US Navy gave Maritime Command five weeks to decide if they wanted the submarine. Argonaut was similar to the submarine already on loan from the United States, but significantly upgraded. The purchase was approved after Maritime Command claimed that Grilse was no longer fit for service and Canada needed a replacement for training purposes.

Canada purchased the hull outright for $153,000 and modernized the submarine at Esquimalt, British Columbia for $2.5 million. In November 1968 the submarine was prepared for departure from Norfolk, Virginia. Argonaut was in poor condition however, with only one of her four diesel engines in working condition, her electrical generator unusable and the boat was leaking.

The boat was commissioned on 2 December 1968 as HMCS Rainbow (SS 75) and sailed for Esquimalt with only two engines working. The submarine caught fire twice while en route to British Columbia and upon arrival, was refused entry into port due to unpaid taxes and customs on her purchase. Once the government had paid the $12,000 owing, Rainbow entered Esquimalt and began her refit. The modernization took eight months to complete and following its completion, Rainbow took up the duties of the out-of-service Grilse of performing anti-submarine warfare training on the West Coast.

Rainbow was decommissioned on 31 December 1974 due to budget cuts and her need for a refit. Maritime Command kept the submarine in reserve, laid up until 1976, hoping to return her to service. However, in 1976, the boat was returned to the United States and scrapped at Portland, Oregon in 1977 for $213,687.

Legacy

There is a detailed 1/100th scale model of Argonaut in the Submarine Force Museum in Groton, Connecticut.

Awards
Asiatic-Pacific Campaign Medal with one battle star 
World War II Victory Medal 
Navy Occupation Medal with "EUROPE" clasp
National Defense Service Medal with bronze service star

References

Sources
 
 
 
 
 

Tench-class submarines
Ships built in Kittery, Maine
1944 ships
World War II submarines of the United States
Cold War submarines of the United States
Tench-class submarines of the Canadian Forces